Sky Dream may refer to:

 Sky Dream Fukuoka, a former Ferris wheel in Japan
 Sky Dream (Taiwan), a Ferris wheel in Taiwan